The 2019–20 Missouri Tigers women's basketball team represented the University of Missouri during the 2019–20 NCAA Division I women's basketball season. The Tigers, led by tenth-year head coach Robin Pingeton, played their home games at Mizzou Arena and competed as members of the Southeastern Conference (SEC).

Offseason

Departures

Incoming

Source:

Incoming Transfers

Roster

Preseason

SEC media poll
The SEC media poll was released on October 15, 2019.

Schedule

|-
!colspan=9 style=| Non-conference regular season

|-
!colspan=9 style=| SEC regular season

|-
!colspan=9 style=| SEC Tournament

References

Missouri Tigers women's basketball seasons
Missouri
Missouri Tigers women's
Missouri Tigers women's